Anabel is a feminine given name.

Anabel may also refer to:

 Anabel, Missouri, US, an unincorporated community
 Anabel (Brazilian TV series), a 2005 Brazilian animated television series
 Anabel (Mexican TV series), a 1988 Mexican comedy and variety television series

See also
 Annabel (disambiguation)